Frost Giant may refer to :

Jötunn, a being in Nordic Mythology, often glossed as "giant"
Frost giants in Marvel Comics, see Giants (Marvel Comics)
Frost giants in Dungeons & Dragons, see Giant (Dungeons & Dragons)
Frost Giant (album), 2005 album by The Dead Science
Frost Giant Studios, a video game studio formed in 2020
The Frost-Giant's Daughter, a Robert E. Howard story featuring Conan the Barbarian.

See also
Ice giant (disambiguation)
Giants of the Frost, a 2004 horror/fantasy novel by Kim Wilkins.